The Snow Baronetcy, of Salesbury in the County of Southampton, was a title in the Baronetage of England.  It was created on 25 June 1679 for Jeremy Snow.  He was childless and the title became extinct on his death in 1702.

Snow baronets, of Salesbury (1679)
Sir Jeremy Snow, 1st Baronet (–1702)

References

Extinct baronetcies in the Baronetage of England
1679 establishments in England